Hearts in Armor is the second studio album by American country music singer Trisha Yearwood. It was released on September 1, 1992, by MCA Nashville.

Four of its tracks found spots in the Billboard Hot Country Singles chart in 1992 and 1993: "Wrong Side of Memphis" rose to No. 5, "Walkaway Joe" to No. 2, "You Say You Will" to No. 12, and "Down on My Knees" to No. 19. The album rose to No. 12 in the Billboard country albums chart.

The album was released immediately following Yearwood's divorce with her first husband, and has been considered one of her greatest albums. It was met with mostly positive reviews by critics. The album includes a variety of styles, including slow ballads and fast up-tempo material.
Three of the album's tracks feature guest harmony vocalists: "Woman Walk the Line" (originally performed by Emmylou Harris on her album The Ballad of Sally Rose) features background vocals from Harris. "Walkaway Joe" features vocals from Eagles vocalist Don Henley, and Raul Malo of The Mavericks is featured on "For Reasons I've Forgotten" and "Wrong Side of Memphis".

Track listing

U.S. Special Edition Track listing 
 "You Say You Will" - 3:39
 "The Woman Before Me" - 3:47
 "When Goodbye Was A Word" - 3:10
 "Walkaway Joe" - 4:21
 "Down on My Knees" - 3:54
 "That's What I Like About You" - 2:38
 "Woman Walk The Line" - 4:33
 "You Don't Have To Move That Mountain" - 3:38
 "Hearts in Armor" - 4:22
 "Wrong Side of Memphis" - 2:46
 "Like We Never Had A Broken Heart" - 3:41
 "Fools Like Me" - 3:38
 "Nearest Distant Here" - 3:26
 She's in Love with the Boy" - 4:07
 "Lonesome Dove" - 3:34

Personnel 
 Trisha Yearwood – lead vocals

Musicians
 Matt Rollings – acoustic piano (1-7, 9, 10)
 Steve Nathan – acoustic piano (8)
 Brent Mason – electric guitars (1-9)
 Billy Joe Walker, Jr. – acoustic guitar (1, 3-6, 8)
 Tim Mensy – acoustic guitar (2)
 Don Potter – acoustic guitar (2, 7, 9)
 Weldon Myrick – steel guitar (1, 2, 5, 6, 9)
 Buddy Emmons – steel guitar (8)
 Jerry Douglas – dobro (4)
 Sam Bush – mandolin (5, 6)
 Dave Pomeroy – bass (1-7, 9)
 Glenn Worf – bass (8)
 Eddie Bayers – drums (1-9)
 Rob Hajacos – fiddle (1, 8)
 Stuart Duncan – fiddle (5, 6)
 Kristin Wilkinson – viola (10)

Production 
 Garth Fundis – producer, mixing
 Gary Laney – recording, mixing  
 Linelle – recording assistant 
 Dave Sinko – recording assistant, mixing 
 Denny Purcell – mastering
 Georgetown Masters (Nashville, Tennessee) – mastering location 
 Scott Pascahll – production assistant
 Bill Brunt Designs – art direction, design 
 Jim "Señor" McGuire – front cover photography
 Randee St. Nicholas – additional photography
 Maria Von Matthiessen – additional photography
 Sheri McCoy – stylist

Charts

Album

Certifications

Singles

References

1992 albums
Albums produced by Garth Fundis
MCA Records albums
Trisha Yearwood albums